Transcription initiation factor TFIID subunit 7 also known as TAFII55 is a protein that in humans is encoded by the TAF7 gene.

Function 

The intronless gene for this transcription coactivator is located between the protocadherin beta and gamma gene clusters on chromosome 5. The protein encoded by this gene is a component of the TFIID protein complex, a complex which binds to the TATA box in class II promoters and recruits RNA polymerase II and other factors. This particular subunit interacts with the largest TFIID subunit, as well as multiple transcription activators. The protein is required for transcription by promoters targeted by RNA polymerase II.

The general transcription factor, TFIID, consists of the TATA-binding protein (TBP) associated with a series of TBP-associated factors (TAFs) that together participate in the assembly of the transcription preinitiation complex. TAFII55 binds to TAFII250 and inhibits its acetyltransferase activity. The exact role of TAFII55 is currently unknown but studies have shown that it interacts with the C-jun pathway. The conserved region is situated towards the N-terminal of the protein. This entry talks about the N-terminal domain.

Crystallographic studies have revealed a very significant hydrophobic pocket between TAF7 and TAF1, its main binding partner. Due to the incredible hydrophobicity of this interaction, it is unlikely that TAF1 would be able to fold properly without the presence of TAF7. Thus, it is possible that TAF7 is required for proper production of TAF1

Interactions 

TAF7 has been shown to interact with:
 TAF15, 
 TAF1,  and
 TATA binding protein.

References

Further reading

External links